Phaedros Stassinos (1930 – 28 June 2012) was a Greek Cypriot actor whose international stage name was Paul Stassino.

Early life
Stassino was born in Platres and grew up in nearby Limassol, but spent most of his acting career in England. He had moved there at the age of 18 to study law. Without telling his parents, he got a scholarship to the Royal Academy of Dramatic Art.

Career
He appeared in many British films, in British TV dramas such as Danger Man and The Saint. He appeared in Coronation Street in 1968, as Hungarian demolition contractor Miklos Zadic who had a brief relationship with Emily Nugent (played by Eileen Derbyshire).

Possibly his best known performance was when he played two parts, Major François Derval and Angelo Palazzi, in the James Bond film Thunderball (see List of James Bond henchmen in Thunderball).

Other roles include "Le Pirate" in That Riviera Touch, and the first officer of the Colombian ship Paloma in Tiger Bay.

In 1972 he moved to Athens, where he worked as a director in the casino in Athens, and then because of his great love for his island, he moved to his birthplace in Cyprus where he worked in the Public Theatre in Nicosia as an actor and as a director, where after he retired he moved to his beloved Limassol. He died on 28 June 2012 in Limassol and was buried in the cemetery of Limassol Sfalagiotisa.

Personal life
He was married twice and had three children Julian Stassino, Alex Stassino, and Elvi Stassinou.

Filmography

 Ill Met by Moonlight (1957) - Yani Katsias
 Interpol (1957) - Customs Inspector
 Miracle in Soho (1957) - Paulo
 Ice Cold in Alex (1958) - Barman
 The Great Van Robbery (1959) - Toni
 The Man Who Liked Funerals (1959) - Nick Morelli
 Tiger Bay (1959) - 'POLOMA' 1st. Officer
 The Bandit of Zhobe (1959) - Hatti
 The Stranglers of Bombay (1960) - Lt. Silver
 Moment of Danger (1960) - Juan Montoya
 Sands of the Desert (1960) - Pilot
 The Criminal (1960) - Alfredo Fanucci
 Exodus (1960) - Driver-guide on Cyprus
 Man Detained (1961) - James Helder
 The Secret Partner (1961) - Man in Soho Street
 The Roman Spring of Mrs. Stone (1961) - Stefano - The Barber
 Echo of Barbara (1961) - Caledonia
 Sammy Going South (1963) - Spyros Dracandopolous
 Stolen Hours (1963) - Dalporto
 The Long Ships (1964) - Raschid
 The Moon-Spinners (1964) - Lambis
 The Verdict (Edgar Wallace Mysteries) (1964) - Danny Thorne
 The Saint Season 3 Episode 9 "The Death Penalty"
 The High Bright Sun (1965) - Alkis
 Thunderball (1965) - François Derval / Angelo Palazzi
 Where the Spies Are (1965) - Simmias
 That Riviera Touch (1966) - Le Pirate
 Sands of Beersheba (1966) - Salim
 The Magus (1968) - Meli
 You Can't Win 'Em All (1970) - Gunner major (uncredited)
 A Touch of the Other (1970) - Connelly
 Die Screaming, Marianne (1971) - Portuguese Police Detective
 Escape to Athena'' (1979) - Zeno's Man (final film role)

References

External links

Paul Stassino at Fandango
Obituary (Greek)

Cypriot male film actors
Cypriot male television actors
Greek Cypriot people
1930 births
2012 deaths
20th-century Cypriot male actors
Cypriot emigrants to England
British people of Greek Cypriot descent
British male film actors
British male television actors
20th-century British male actors
Alumni of RADA